Blackpool North railway station is the main station serving the seaside resort of Blackpool in Lancashire, England.

The station was opened in its present form in 1974, and succeeded a previous station a few hundred yards away on Talbot Road which had first opened in 1846 and had been rebuilt in 1898. The present station is based on the 1938 concrete canopy which covered the entrance to the former excursion platforms of the old station.

Blackpool North has regular services to Manchester, Liverpool, Bolton, Wigan, Preston, Blackburn, Leeds and York. There are six intercity trains a day to London Euston via .  There is one train per week Sunday only to Carlisle via the Ribble Valley and the Settle-Carlisle Line during the summer timetable.

History
The first station opened on 29 April 1846 as Blackpool, renamed Blackpool Talbot Road in 1872, and was first rebuilt in 1898. The rebuilt station consisted of two parallel train sheds and a terminal building, in Dickson Road between Talbot Road and Queen Street. Platforms 1 to 6 were located in the sheds, with a larger island between platforms 1 and 2 to accommodate taxis. In addition, there was effectively, in all but name, a separate station at the east end of Queen Street, with open "excursion" platforms 7 to 16, used only in summer.

The station was recommended for closure in the Beeching Report (1963), but following lobbying by Blackpool Corporation it was Blackpool Central—Blackpool's other centrally-located station, but whose site was better-suited for re-development—which closed in 1964.

The main station buildings, train shed and platforms were decommissioned and demolished in 1974, and the 1938 excursion platform canopy building was refurbished to become the new main station.

Electrification
This resulted in the semaphore signalling at the station being replaced by modern colour lights controlled from the WCML North Rail Operating Centre in Manchester and the station track and platform layout being altered, with the eight curved platforms reduced to six and on a straighter alignment than previously. The project was due for completion by May 2016, with the line onwards to Manchester following by the end of the year. This was subsequently pushed back twice - first to March 2017 and then again to early 2018 (after contractors Balfour Beatty pulled out), so that the track remodelling and re-signalling work could be carried out at the same time as the wiring, reducing disruption to passengers (as only one period of closure would be required).

The remodelling required the station to be completely closed for a significant period of time (up to 18 weeks according to Network Rail), with additional weekend and evening blocks before and after. Replacement buses to Preston operated during the closure.  The station was closed until 16 April 2018 for the work to take place.  A major rebuild and upgrade of the nearby carriage servicing depot was carried out at the same time.

Facilities
The station is staffed and open for 24 hours a day, and is equipped with payphones, vending machines, toilets and indoor seating, as well as a customer service office and a booking office. Step-free access to the station and platform is available for passengers with wheelchairs or prams, and portable ramps are also available for platform-to-train access. The station has its own covered concourse and, adjoining the concourse, it has a Pumpkin cafe, as well as a Point shop to Go convenience store. The station also has a 30-space car park, and adjoining bus connections, which can also accommodate Plusbus ticket holders.

As Blackpool is a popular tourist resort, with its Pleasure Beach and beaches, there are many measures put in to prevent fare evasion, including automated barrier checks, as well as the conductors on the trains.

The station is approximately half-a-mile along Talbot Road from the Blackpool Tramway, which is to be extended to the station in 2018/19 as part of a new transport interchange.

Services

The station is served by Northern Trains and Avanti West Coast. The typical weekday service pattern is:

Northern Trains
1tph to Liverpool Lime Street via 
2tph to Manchester Airport via  (1tph on Sundays)
1tph to  via 

Avanti West Coast
3tpd to London Euston (1 direct, 2 via )

In May 2019, Northern services to York on weekdays resumed, a new summer Sunday service to Carlisle, known as DalesRail, returned and Manchester Piccadilly terminators were extended to Hazel Grove.

Former services
Blackpool North was on the InterCity network until 2003 when Virgin Trains West Coast and Virgin CrossCountry withdrew High Speed Train and Voyager services to London Euston and Birmingham. Former local franchise holder First North Western ran services from Blackpool to London Euston, but these were soon discontinued.
However, in the December 2014 timetable change, Virgin reintroduced direct services to/from London Euston albeit only on weekdays and only one each way a day. As of December 2022, there are two trains a day to/from London Euston.

Virgin CrossCountry used to run up to eight services per day to Blackpool North from Portsmouth Harbour, Brighton and London Paddington. The services were introduced by Virgin to increase the frequency of the CrossCountry trains and were introduced in 2000. They were withdrawn in summer 2003 by the Strategic Rail Authority to improve the general punctuality of train services. First North Western used to operate a Monday-Saturday boat train to/from Holyhead (which attached to a portion from Stockport) until 2003 and briefly operated a service between Blackpool and London Euston.

In December 2008, the service to Manchester Victoria replaced the route to Buxton, though limited services still ran there.

Until 1 April 2016, the service to Manchester Airport was run by First TransPennine Express. The service was part of the TransPennine North West division and was a express service, stopping at far less stations outside of limited services. There was a limited service to Barrow-In-Furness and briefly Glasgow Central in 2010. In May 2015, the Class 185 Units were replaced by loaned Class 156 Units and in April 2016, the route was transferred to Northern. Until late 2018, Class 185 Units were still occasionally used. Since 2016, more stations were added to the service overtime until December 2022.

Northern services to Leeds and York on weekdays were temporarily withdrawn prior to the start of electrification work in November 2017, but resumed in May 2019. Weekday Manchester Victoria services also ended prior to the start of electrification work in 2017 and although the route is now completely wired, there are no direct services at all (the Sunday service ended at the December 2022 timetable change) - travellers have to change trains at one of Preston, Bolton or Salford Crescent.

Tram interchange
In 2017 approval was given for the construction of a new 550 metre, £21 million branch of the Blackpool Tramway from North Pier to Blackpool North station, with a new tram terminal opposite the station. This will recreate the route of an earlier tramway connection to the station along Talbot Road which operated between 1902 and 1936.

Work on the branch began in 2018, and it was originally meant to be open in April 2019, however completion of the branch required the demolition of a Wilko store which sat at the site of the terminus. Delays in relocating the store however, mean that its demolition was not completed until September 2020. A Second delay came from the COVID pandemic. The first tram ran on the branch in March 2022, and it is expected to be opened for public service in Winter 2023.

References

External links

 Blackpool & Fylde Rail Users' Association—Blackpool North, accessed 17 October 2007

Railway stations in Blackpool
Former Preston and Wyre Joint Railway stations
Railway stations served by Avanti West Coast
Northern franchise railway stations
Railway stations in Great Britain opened in 1846
1846 establishments in England
DfT Category C1 stations